Harry Wall was a member of the Washington State Senate.

Biography
Wall was born in Wisconsin in 1894. He would become a lumberjack.

Political career
Wall was a member of the Senate from 1941 to 1947. He was later a delegate to the 1948 Republican National Convention.

References

People from Wisconsin
Republican Party Washington (state) state senators
1894 births
Year of death missing